Saddle Rock is a village on the Great Neck Peninsula in the Town of North Hempstead, in Nassau County, on the North Shore of Long Island, in New York, United States. The population was 830 at the 2010 census.

History 
The first settlers arrived in the 17th century. The Village of Saddle Rock is so named for an offshore boulder that gives the appearance of a saddle, first noted on a map in 1658.

The village is also home to a historic mill. Officially known as the Saddle Rock Grist Mill, it was built circa 1700 and is located inside a small cove that opens onto Little Neck Bay off Long Island Sound. The mill is listed in the National Register of Historic Places and is the oldest continually operating tidal grist mill in the United States. The mill is now owned and operated by Nassau County as a working museum open to the public. The mill has been restored to its mid-19th-century appearance and is located on Grist Mill Lane in Saddle Rock.

The first Mayor of Saddle Rock was Roswell Eldridge, who was appointed "Acting Mayor" after he had incorporated his own private estate as the Village of Saddle Rock in 1911.

In 1926, Eldridge's wife, Louise Udall Skidmore Eldridge, officially became the first female Mayor of Saddle Rock, and reportedly the first female Mayor in the state of New York. Louise Eldridge served as Mayor from 1926 until her death in 1947. She was also the last private individual to own the grist mill.

Geography 

Demographics

As of the census of 2000, there were 791 people, 265 households, and 236 families residing in the village. The population density was 3,239.8 people per square mile (1,272.5/km2). There were 275 housing units at an average density of 1,126.4 per square mile (442.4/km2). The racial makeup of the village was 90.39% White, 0.76% African American, 6.19% Asian, 1.01% from other races, and 1.64% from two or more races. Hispanic or Latino of any race were 1.77% of the population.

Ancestries: Russian (10.5%), United States (9.7%), Arab (9.4%), Polish (5.8%), Hungarian (2.0%), Lithuanian (1.9%).

There were 265 households, out of which 34.7% had children under the age of 18 living with them, 81.5% were married couples living together, 3.8% had a female householder with no husband present, and 10.9% were non-families. 8.7% of all households were made up of individuals, and 7.5% had someone living alone who was 65 years of age or older. The average household size was 2.98 and the average family size was 3.15.

In the village, the population was spread out, with 23.1% under the age of 18, 7.6% from 18 to 24, 15.7% from 25 to 44, 33.6% from 45 to 64, and 20.0% who were 65 years of age or older. The median age was 48 years. For every 100 females, there were 95.3 males. For every 100 females age 18 and over, there were 92.4 males.

The median income for a household in the village was $125,630, and the median income for a family was $137,962. Males had a median income of $92,073 versus $40,625 for females. The per capita income for the village was $63,242. About 3.4% of families and 3.0% of the population were below the poverty line, including 4.8% of those under age 18 and 4.0% of those age 65 or over.

Government

Village Government 
As of August 2022, the Mayor of Saddle Rock is Dan Levy, the Deputy Mayor is David H. Schwartz, and the Village Trustees are Manny Alani, Alex Kishinevsky, and Ronen Ben-Josef. The mayor, deputy mayor, and trustee positions are unpaid, volunteer positions.

The following is a list of the Mayors of Saddle Rock', from 1911 to present:

Representation in higher government

Town representation 
Saddle Rock is located in the Town of North Hempstead's 5th district, which as of August 2022 is represented on the Town Board by David A. Adhami (R–Great Neck).

Nassau County representation 
Saddle Rock is located in Nassau County's 10th Legislative district, which as of August 2022 is represented in the Nassau County Legislature by Mazi Melesa Pilip (R–Great Neck).

New York State representation

New York State Assembly 
Saddle Rock is located in the New York State Assembly's 16th Assembly district, which as of August 2022 is represented in the New York State Assembly by Gina Sillitti (D–Manorhaven).

New York State Senate 
Saddle Rock is located in the New York State Senate's 7th State Senate district, which as of August 2022 is represented in the New York State Senate by Anna Kaplan (D–North Hills).

Federal representation

United States Congress 
Saddle Rock is located in New York's 3rd congressional district, which as of August 2022 is represented in the United States Congress by Tom Suozzi (D–Glen Cove).

United States Senate 
Like the rest of New York, Saddle Rock is represented in the United States Senate by Charles Schumer (D) and Kirsten Gillibrand (D).

Politics 
In the 2016 U.S. presidential election, the majority of Saddle Rock voters voted for Donald Trump (R).

Education

School district 
Saddle Rock is located entirely within the boundaries of the Great Neck Union Free School District. As such, all children who reside within the village and attend public schools go to Great Neck's schools.

Library district 
Saddle Rock is located within the boundaries of the Great Neck Library District.

Infrastructure

Transportation

Road 

Major roadways in the Village of Saddle Rock include Bayview Avenue and Old Mill Road.

Additionally, the 9-11 Memorial Bridge is located within the village, connecting Bayview Avenue in Saddle Rock to West Shore Road in Kings Point.

Rail 
No rail lines run through the Village of Saddle Rock. The nearest Long Island Rail Road station to the village is Great Neck on the Port Washington Branch.

Bus 
The Village of Saddle Rock is served by the n57 bus route, which is operated by Nassau Inter-County Express.

Utilities

Natural gas 
National Grid USA provides natural gas to homes and businesses that are hooked up to natural gas lines in the Village of Great Neck.

Power 
PSEG Long Island provides power to all homes and businesses within the Village of Great Neck.

Sewage 
The Village of Saddle Rock is connected to (and is thus served by) the Great Neck Water Pollution Control District's sanitary sewer network.

Water 
The Village of Saddle Rock is located within the boundaries of the Water Authority of Great Neck North, which provides the entirety of the village with water.

Landmark

 Saddle Rock Grist Mill

See also 

 Saddle Rock Estates – an adjacent, unincorporated hamlet and CDP which shares a portion of its name with Saddle Rock.

References

External links

 Official website

Great Neck Peninsula
Villages in New York (state)
Villages in Nassau County, New York
Populated coastal places in New York (state)